Bevan French  (born 4 January 1996) is an Australian professional rugby league footballer who plays as a er and  for the Wigan Warriors in the Super League.

He has played for the Parramatta Eels in the NRL and the Indigenous All Stars side.

Background
French was born in Tingha, New South Wales, Australia, and is of Indigenous Australian descent. He is the nephew of former Australian international and St George Illawarra Dragons winger Nathan Blacklock.

He played his junior rugby league for the Inverell Hawks. French was educated and 2013 graduate at Inverell High School.

Playing career

Early career
At the age of 15, French began playing for Tingha's first-grade team at fullback, playing against men twice his age.

Early in 2013, French was pursued by six NRL clubs; Parramatta, Melbourne, Newcastle, the Gold Coast, Penrith and St. George Illawarra. He eventually signed for the Parramatta Eels, stating that he chose the club because he "just had a feeling". 

In 2015 and 2016, he played for the Eels' NYC team. In 2015, he began the season at five-eighth, before moving back to fullback for the remainder of the year, finishing the season with 16 tries in 22 games. On 11 July 2015, he re-signed with the Parramatta club on a three-year contract to the end of the 2018 season.

2016
In February, French participated in Eels' 2016 NRL Auckland Nines tournament win, scoring 8 tries in the tournament, the record for most tries in a Nines tournament. He was also named in the team of the tournament. In Round 12 of the 2016 NRL season, French made his NRL debut against the Newcastle Knights, scoring a try in the 20-18 win at Hunter Stadium. In Round 15, against the South Sydney Rabbitohs, French scored his first double in Parramatta's 30-12 win at ANZ Stadium. In Round 17, against the Cronulla-Sutherland Sharks, French scored his first hat-trick of tries in Parramatta's 34-24 loss at Shark Park. In the last two matches of the regular season, French switched with Michael Gordon to play from the wing to fullback, scoring two hat-tricks in two weeks in a row in Parramatta's 30-18 win against the St. George Illawarra Dragons and 40-18 win against the New Zealand Warriors. French quickly went on to be a try-scoring sensation in his debut season the NRL, being the club's highest try-scorer with 19 tries in 13 matches in the 2016 NRL season.

2017
On 10 February 2017, French represented the Indigenous All Stars against the World All Stars in the 2017 All Stars match, playing off the interchange bench in the 34-8 win at Hunter Stadium.  French played 16 games for Parramatta in the 2017 season scoring 9 tries but missed most of the season with a troubling hamstring injury.  French injured himself just before the start of the finals series, Parramatta's first in eight seasons and missed both finals games against Melbourne and North Queensland.

2018
French started the 2018 season at fullback ahead of Clint Gutherson who was still out with an injury and the returning Jarryd Hayne.  In round 3 of the season, French injured his shoulder in the 14-4 loss to Cronulla and missed the following two games. He was then recalled to the side to face Canberra but was slammed by fans and the media after the match due to the fact that he only made one run for the whole game making 15 metres.  French was dropped by coach Brad Arthur for the following week.  French spoke of his demotion saying "We spoke about how my shoulder was going to be in pain going into the game and getting a needle before the game that was supposedly meant to numb it for six hours or something, But 15 minutes in I felt it. Because of that I didn't really get into the game and it was playing in the back of my mind, Injury did play a part in my poor performance but it was form as well. Brad pulled me into his office at training and sort of explained why I was dropped and I couldn't blame him, it was the right thing to do."

On 2 June 2018, French was named at fullback for Parramatta's round 13 clash against Newcastle but was taken from the field only two minutes into the match due to a nasty head collision involving Newcastle player Kalyn Ponga.
On 13 July 2018, Parramatta who were in last place on the ladder played against Newcastle and with 34 seconds remaining French crossed over to score the match winning try only for the decision to be overturned due to video replays showing French had put a foot into touch while grounding the ball.  Newcastle held on to win the game 18-16. On 7 August, French was demoted to reserve grade by coach Brad Arthur after a number of mixed performances.  It came in the wake of French speaking to the media a week earlier declaring he was open to the idea of leaving Parramatta if he was not given a chance to play fullback.

2019
At the start of the 2019 NRL season, French was left out of the Parramatta side as coach Brad Arthur went with Blake Ferguson and Maika Sivo as the preferred wing options and Clint Gutherson as the preferred fullback.  On 22 April 2019, French scored the first ever try at the new Western Sydney Stadium for the Wentworthville Magpies against Western Suburbs in a 20-14 victory.

On 27 July, French signed a two-year contract with English side Wigan after being frozen out of the first team at Parramatta.  Before signing with Wigan, French spent his time with Wentworthville in the Canterbury Cup NSW competition making 15 appearances and scoring 13 tries.

French made his debut appearance for Wigan against Hull KR coming off the bench in a 36-18 victory.

2020
French played in the 2020 Super League Grand Final for Wigan which the club lost 8-4 against St Helens.  With the scores at 4-4 and less than ten seconds on the clock, St Helens attempted a long range field goal which hit the right hand upright. The ball bounced past French and came into the hands of Jack Welsby who scored the winning try of the game.

2021
After missing the opening three rounds of the 2021 Super League season, French returned for Wigan's round 4 match and scored two tries in a 22-12 victory over Castleford.

French injured his hamstring in the round 7 match against Salford. French was initially ruled out for twelve weeks with a torn hamstring.

Wigan later put out a statement, on 28 June, clarifying that French’s injury was worse than first expected. He was ruled out for the 2021 Super League season and would return to Australia, to be with family during his rehabilitation. At the same time, French triggered a clause in his contract meaning that he would remain at the club for the 2022 season.

2022
On 28 May, French played for Wigan in their 2022 Challenge Cup Final win over Huddersfield.
In round 15 of the 2022 Super League season, French scored a hat-trick in Wigan's 30-12 victory over Salford.
In round 18, French scored two tries for Wigan in a 20-18 loss against St Helens at Magic Weekend.
The following week, French scored a Super League record seven tries in Wigan's 60-0 victory over Hull F.C. to overtake the six tries that Lesley Vainikolo scored against coincidentally Hull F.C. in 2005.
In round 21, French scored a hat-trick in Wigan's 46-4 victory over Hull Kingston Rovers.
In round 24, French scored another hat-trick in Wigan's 52-6 victory over Toulouse Olympique. On 4 September, French made the Super League dream team. French finished the regular season with 33 tries in 23 appearances for Wigan.
On 20 September 2022, Wigan confirmed that French had signed a new two-year contract with the club, keeping him at the club until 2024.

2023
In round 2 of the 2023 Super League season, French scored two tries for Wigan in a 60-0 victory over Wakefield Trinity.

References

External links

Wigan Warriors profile
SL profile
Parramatta Eels profile
Eels profile
NRL profile

1996 births
Living people
Australian rugby league players
Indigenous All Stars players
Indigenous Australian rugby league players
Parramatta Eels players
Rugby league fullbacks
Rugby league players from New South Wales
Rugby league wingers
Sportsmen from New South Wales
Wentworthville Magpies players
Wigan Warriors players
Australian expatriate sportspeople in England